Levin Hicks Campbell (born January 2, 1927) is an inactive Senior United States circuit judge of the United States Court of Appeals for the First Circuit.

Education and career

Born in Summit, New Jersey, Campbell received an Artium Baccalaureus degree from Harvard University in 1948 and a Bachelor of Laws from Harvard Law School in 1951. He served as a United States Army Lieutenant in the Judge Advocate General's Corps from 1952 to 1954, and received the Commendation Medal for his service in Korea. He then went into private practice of law in Boston, Massachusetts with Ropes, Gray, Best, Coolidge & Rugg. He entered politics in 1963, performing several roles in Massachusetts over the next decade. He was a member of the Massachusetts House of Representatives from 1963 to 1964. Later he was an assistant attorney general of Massachusetts, serving under Attorney General Edward W. Brooke, and First Assistant Attorney General of Massachusetts serving under Attorney General Elliott L. Richardson, before being appointed an associate justice of the Massachusetts Superior Court in 1968, a position in which he served through 1970.

Federal judicial service

Campbell was nominated by President Richard Nixon on November 12, 1971, to a seat on the United States District Court for the District of Massachusetts vacated by Judge Charles Edward Wyzanski Jr. He was confirmed by the United States Senate on November 23, 1971, and received his commission on November 30, 1971. His service terminated on August 31, 1972, due to his elevation to the First Circuit.

Campbell was nominated by President Nixon on June 15, 1972, to a seat on the United States Court of Appeals for the First Circuit vacated by Judge Bailey Aldrich. He was confirmed by the Senate on June 28, 1972, and received his commission on June 30, 1972. He served as Chief Judge from 1983 to 1990. He assumed senior status on January 3, 1992.

See also
 List of United States federal judges by longevity of service

References

Sources
 

1927 births
Living people
The Harvard Lampoon alumni
Harvard Law School alumni
Judges of the United States Court of Appeals for the First Circuit
Judges of the United States District Court for the District of Massachusetts
Massachusetts Republicans
Massachusetts state court judges
Members of the Massachusetts House of Representatives
People from Summit, New Jersey
United States court of appeals judges appointed by Richard Nixon
United States district court judges appointed by Richard Nixon
20th-century American judges
People associated with Ropes & Gray